The Minnesota Transfer Railway  was a short line railroad in the United States. It was incorporated on March 22, 1883.

It was owned by nine major railroads serving the Twin Cities:
Chicago, Burlington and Quincy Railroad
Chicago Great Western Railway
Chicago, Milwaukee, St. Paul and Pacific Railroad 
Chicago, Rock Island and Pacific Railroad 
Chicago, St. Paul, Minneapolis and Omaha Railway 
Great Northern Railway
Minneapolis and St. Louis Railway
Minneapolis, St. Paul and Sault Ste. Marie Railway
Northern Pacific Railway

It consisted of a junction from Merriam Park from the Milwaukee road, to the Great Northern Railway, where it ran along until it cut north to cross the Northern Pacific tracks. It went north to New Brighton to the Stockyards. The Minnesota Transfer Railway acquired the Minnesota Belt Line Railway in 1898. The belt line ran 14 miles from the Northern Pacific and Great Northern tracks in Fridley, called Belt Line Junction, to the Minneapolis stock yards in New Brighton.

The railroad provided transfer and terminal services to these railroads, as well as serving local industrial customers. It served to funnel up to 3,500 cars a day through the St. Paul freight yards as well as originating and delivering up to 400 carloads of freight from industries located on its lines.

The Midway yard which is part of it has 7 parts:
• C yard - 27 tracks, westbound arrival tracks 
• J yard - 13 tracks, cars bound for local industries on the MTRY 
• P yard - 29 tracks, eastbound arrival, departure & classification tracks 
• A yard - 42 tracks, westbound classification & departure tracks 
• B yard - 8 tracks, arrival/departure tracks 
• F yard - storage tracks 
• R yard - RIP tracks

MTFR 200, an Alco RS-3, is preserved in operating condition at the Illinois Railway Museum.  MTFR 62, one of five Alco S-1 on the MTFR, is preserved in stored condition at the Hub City Heritage Museum  in Oelwein, Iowa.

Through a series of mergers over the years, by the 1960s it was owned by Great Northern, Northern Pacific, the Burlington Route, the Rock Island, the Milwaukee Road, the Soo Line Railroad, and the Chicago & Northwestern Railway. The former three merged in 1970 as the Burlington Northern Railroad. The MTR was acquired by the Minnesota Commercial Railway in 1987.

References

External links

 MTFR's Diesel Roster
 An Inventory of Its Records at the Minnesota Historical Society
 Pictures of three diesel locomotives

Defunct Minnesota railroads
Switching and terminal railroads
1883 establishments in Minnesota
1987 disestablishments in Minnesota